J5, J 5, J05 or J-5 may refer to:
 Fender J5 Telecaster, a guitar model made by Fender
 ATC code J05 Antivirals for systemic use, a subgroup of the Anatomical Therapeutic Chemical Classification System
 County Route J5 (California), a County route in San Joaquin County, California
 GSR Class J5, a 1921 Irish 0-6-0 steam locomotives class
 HMS J5, a 1916 Royal Australian Navy J class submarine
 Joint Chiefs of Global Tax Enforcement (J5), a global joint operational group, formed in mid-2018 to combat transnational tax crime
 Junkers J 5, a German Junkers aircraft
 Mazda J5 Engine, a Mazda piston engine
 LNER Class J5, a class of British steam locomotives
Peugeot J5, a midsize van manufactured from 1981 to 1993, a rebadged Fiat Ducato
 Piper J-5 'Cub Cruiser', a three-seat aircraft build during the 1940s.
 Shenyang J-5, Chinese version of the MiG-17
 Eirene (moon), previously known as S/2003 J 5, a retrograde irregular satellite of Jupiter
 Samsung Galaxy J5, a smartphone produced by Samsung
 TVB J5, a Television Broadcasts Limited's TV Channel (Feb 2016-Aug 2017), formerly called TVB HD Jade(高清翡翠台), after name changed to TVB Finance & Information Channel(無綫財經·資訊台)
 Pentagonal cupola, Johnson Solid number 5

and also:
 The Jackson 5, a Motown R&B/soul act
 Johnny 5, the robotic star of the movies Short Circuit and Short Circuit 2
 Jump5, a dance pop group
 Jurassic 5, a hip hop group
 Ranger (yacht), an America's Cup racing yacht built 1937
 The character J-5 played by Lou Wagner in Lost in Space
 J05: Acute obstructive laryngitis (croup) and epiglottitis ICD-10 code